MIFC is an acronym and may refer to:

Midwest Intercollegiate Football Conference, a defunct college football conference in the United States
Mynydd Isa F.C., a Welsh football (soccer) team
 Malaysia International Islamic Financial Centre (MIFC)
 Material & Information Flow Chart, a tool used in Value Stream Mapping